Frederick Thomas Derham (8 January 1844 – 12 March 1922) was an Australian politician.

Born in Somerset to auctioneer Thomas Plumley Derham and Sarah Ann Watts, he arrived in Melbourne in 1856 and entered the business world, eventually becoming a biscuit manufacturer. In 1864 he married Ada Maria Anderson in Melbourne, with whom he had four children; he later married Frances Dodd Swallow in 1878, with whom he had five children. In 1883 he was elected to the Victorian Legislative Assembly as the member for Sandridge, shifting to Port Melbourne in 1889; he served as Postmaster-General from 1886 to 1890. Subsequently, he was president of the Chamber of Manufacturers from 1897 to 1903 and of the Employers' Federation from 1901 to 1904. Derham died at Kew in 1922.

References

1844 births
1922 deaths
Members of the Victorian Legislative Assembly
English emigrants to Australia
People from Somerset
Australian postmasters